MEN2B may refer to:

MEN2B, a Dutch boy band that won the first season of the Dutch Popstars: The Rivals in 2004 
Multiple endocrine neoplasia type 2b